M&T may refer to:
 Energy monitoring and targeting, an energy efficiency technique
 Markt+Technik, a book publisher
 M&T Bank, an American bank holding company
 Mortise and tenon, a woodworking technique